Eliomar dos Santos Silva (born 12 February 1987, in Garanhuns) is a Brazilian football striker who plays as a forward for Inter de Santa Maria.

Football career

Eliomar signed a two-year contract with Clube Náutico Capibaribe in April 2005, and went on to sign a two-year contract extension on 16 May 2007. On 13 July 2007, however, he was signed by NK Međimurje of the Croatian First League.

He scored 6 goals in 29 matches during his debut season in the Croatian First League in 2007-08, at the end of which the club were relegated to the Croatian Second League. In the Second League, he scored 10 times in 22 matches as the club won promotion back to the First League for the 2009-10 season. Unfortunately, NK Međimurje was able to stay in Croatian First League only one season. After they were relegated, Eliomar left the club and joined NK Istra 1961 from Pula.

In 2011, he returned to Brazil and signed with Guarany Sporting Club.

References

External links
 Profile at Sportnet.hr
 Profile at Nogometni-magazin.com

People from Garanhuns
1987 births
Living people
Brazilian footballers
Brazilian expatriate footballers
Association football forwards
Sportspeople from Pernambuco
Croatian Football League players
Clube Náutico Capibaribe players
NK Međimurje players
NK Istra 1961 players
Guarany Sporting Club players
Associação Chapecoense de Futebol players
Figueirense FC players
Esporte Clube Novo Hamburgo players
Associação Desportiva Recreativa e Cultural Icasa players
Operário Ferroviário Esporte Clube players
Brusque Futebol Clube players
Clube Náutico Marcílio Dias players
Joinville Esporte Clube players
Uberlândia Esporte Clube players
Sociedade Esportiva e Recreativa Caxias do Sul players
Clube Atlético Tubarão players
Esporte Clube Pelotas players
Moto Club de São Luís players
Esporte Clube Internacional players
Brazilian expatriate sportspeople in Croatia
Expatriate footballers in Croatia